Michael Savage is an American radio host, author and conservative political commentator.

Michael Savage may also refer to:
 Michael Joseph Savage (1872–1940), Prime Minister of New Zealand, 1935–1940
 Michael Savage (sociologist) (born 1959), British sociologist and academic
 Michael Savage (politician) (born 1960), Canadian politician
 Michael Savage (Gaelic footballer) (born 1986), Gaelic football goalkeeper with Dublin